Watcharakorn Manoworn (born June 17, 1996) is a Thai professional footballer who plays as a midfielder.

Honours

Club
Buriram United
 Thailand Champions Cup (1): 2019

Uthai Thani
Thai League 3 (1): 2021–22
Thai League 3 Northern Region (1): 2021–22

References

https://us.soccerway.com/players/watcharakorn-manoworn/597003/

1996 births
Living people
Watcharakorn Manoworn
Watcharakorn Manoworn
Association football midfielders
Watcharakorn Manoworn
Watcharakorn Manoworn
Watcharakorn Manoworn
Watcharakorn Manoworn
Watcharakorn Manoworn